Diploderma slowinskii is a species of lizard, which was first identified in the Yunnan province of China in 2017. The lizard is named after American herpetologist, Joseph Bruno Slowinski.

Description 
The lizard is relatively large, it has a robust head and a compressed body. Its reproduction is oviparous.

References 

Diploderma
Reptiles of China
Endemic fauna of Yunnan
Reptiles described in 2017